Siti Zaqyah Abdul Razak (born 25 October 1988), known professionally as Tiz Zaqyah, is a Malaysian actress, model and singer. She debuted in 2006 and since then has starred in films, dramas, telemovies and television and magazine advertisements. She rose to fame for playing the role of Nur Amina in the 2009 hit drama Nur Kasih with Remy Ishak, Fizz Fairuz and Sharifah Sofia. She became best known for her leading roles in Asmaradana, Gemilang, Soffiya, Dejavu di Kinabalu, Sebenarnya, Saya Isteri Dia! where she played a role of Shaf alongside Izzue Islam, Cinta Jangan Pergi where she acted with her acclaimed former counterpart partner, Remy Ishak, Jodoh Itu Milik Kita and Kusinero Cinta.

Early life
Tiz Zaqyah was born on 25 October 1988, in Kuala Lumpur, Malaysia. She is the second daughter of two siblings and has one sister. She graduated from Subang Jaya Secondary School in November 2005. She began her acting career at the age of 18. She was listed on Malaysia's 10 most beautiful actress when she wears a scarf. Tiz Zaqyah is said as the actress that have an aura in her acting.

On 9 May 2021, she announced on her Instagram account that she tested positive for COVID-19 after she started develop symptoms of coughing and short shivers.

Career
Tiz Zaqyah made her acting debut in the 2006 8TV drama Gol & Gincu The Series as a cameo role. Her major breakthrough was the drama Nur Kasih directed by Kabir Bhatia in 2009. In 2010, Tiz acted for two drama series, Spa Qistina playing a role as Maya and Asmaradana, a 25 episode drama broadcast by Grand Brilliance for whom she played as Tengku Azizah, together with other co stars, Shaheizy Sam and Iqram Dinzly. The production was well received by the audiences and was awarded as Best Drama in Profima Awards 2010. The series was aired on 9 March. In December 2010, it reported that Nur Kasih drama will be filmed and will run on 2011 and Tiz will sing a theme song for that film and duet with Yassin who sang the theme song for Nur Kasih drama.

In 2011, she starred in such hit dramas as Gemilang and Soffiya. In drama Gemilang she played a character as a teacher who wanted her student excel in their studies and in drama Soffiya Tiz played role as a person who has many problems and was raped by her own father. In March 2011, it was reported that Tiz will acting in her second film titled Cinta Kura Kura and that film is scheduled to hit the platform next year on 1 March 2012.

In March 2012, Tiz Zaqyah starred in Cinta Kura Kura, a Malaysian film produced by KRU Studios. She acted as Nani, a 21-year-old bubbly girl together with her beloved pet turtle, NICO played by Zizan. This movie was released in March 2012. In 2012, Tiz involved in the serial drama Dejavu di Kinabalu. In this drama, Tiz brings the character of a woman who had just undergone heart transplant surgery and he has the personality traits of the original owner's heart that makes her heart to the man is linked to the original owner lover's heart.

In 2013, Tiz will be starred in Cinta Jangan Pergi drama where she will be acting besides her former lover, Remy Ishak. On 13 January 2013, Tiz announced on her Facebook page that she would appear in a new drama called Oh My English Season 2.

Filmography

Film

Television series

Television movie

Web series

Discography

Soundtrack appearances

Awards and nominations

References

External links

 

1988 births
Living people
Malaysian people of Malay descent
People from Kuala Lumpur
21st-century Malaysian actresses
Malaysian film actresses
Malaysian television actresses
21st-century Malaysian women singers
Malay-language singers
Malaysian female models